The National Synchrotron Light Source II (NSLS-II) at Brookhaven National Laboratory (BNL) in Upton, New York is a national user research facility funded primarily by the U.S. Department of Energy's (DOE) Office of Science. NSLS-II is one of the world's most advanced synchrotron light sources, designed to produce x-rays 10,000 times brighter than BNL's original light source, the National Synchrotron Light Source (NSLS). NSLS-II supports basic and applied research in energy security, advanced materials synthesis and manufacturing, environment, and human health.

NSLS-II is a state-of-the-art, medium-energy electron storage ring (3 billion electron-volts). The facility enables the study of material properties and functions with nanoscale resolution and exquisite sensitivity by providing world-leading capabilities for x-ray imaging and high-resolution energy analysis. The facility is open to researchers from academia and industry.

NSLS-II fuels major advances in new energy technologies such as nanocatalyst-based fuel cells, economical use of solar energy, high-temperature superconductors in a high capacity and high reliability electric grid, and advanced electrical storage systems for transportation and harnessing intermittent renewable energy sources.

Users and partners

Users 

In 2017, NSLS-II served over 1,000 researchers ("users") from academic, industrial, and government laboratories worldwide. Any qualified researcher can submit a peer-reviewed proposal to use NSLS-II.

Partners 
NSLS-II partners with public and private institutions to fund the construction and operation of some of its beamlines. Its partnerships include BNL's Center for Functional Nanomaterials and the National Institute of Standards and Technology, among many others. NSLS-II is always open for new partnerships.

Beamlines 
NSLS-II currently has 29 beamlines (experimental stations) open for user operations. When the facility is complete, NSLS-II will have at least 58 beamlines in operation.

The beamlines at NSLS-II are grouped into five science programs: hard x-ray scattering & spectroscopy, imaging & microscopy, structural biology, soft x-ray scattering & spectroscopy, and complex scattering. These programs group beamlines together that offer similar types of research techniques for studying the behavior and structure of matter.

Hard X-ray scattering & spectroscopy 
 6-BM: Materials Measurement (BMM) 
 7-BM: Quick X-ray Absorption and Scattering (QAS)
 8-ID: Inner Shell Spectroscopy (ISS)
27-ID: High Energy X-ray Diffraction (HEX) (under construction)
 28-ID-1: Pair Distribution Function (PDF)
 28-ID-2: X-Ray Powder Diffraction (XPD)

Imaging and microscopy 
 3-ID: Hard X-ray Nanoprobe (HXN)
 4-BM: X-ray Fluorescence Microprobe (XFM)
 5-ID: Submicron Resolution X-ray Spectroscopy (SRX)
8-BM: Tender Energy X-ray Absorption Spectroscopy (TES)
9-ID: Coherent Diffraction Imaging (CDI) (under construction)
 18-ID: Full-Field X-ray Imaging (FXI)

Structural biology 
 16-ID: Life Science X-ray Scattering (LIX)
 17-ID-1: Highly Automated Macromolecular Crystallography Beamline (AMX)
 17-ID-2: Frontier Microfocusing Macromolecular Crystallography (FMX)
 17-BM: X-ray Footprinting of Biological Materials (XFP)
 19-ID: Biological Microdiffraction Facility (NYX)

Soft X-ray scattering & spectroscopy 
 2-ID: Soft Inelastic X-ray Scattering (SIX)
7-ID-1: Spectroscopy Soft and Tender 1 (SST-1)
 7-ID-2: Spectroscopy Soft and Tender 2 (SST-2)
 21-ID-1: Electron Spectro-Microscopy ARPES (ESM-ARPES)
21-ID-2: Electron Spectro-Microscopy XPEEM (ESM-XPEEM)
 22-IR-1: Frontier Synchrotron Infrared Spectroscopy (FIS)
 22-IR-2: Magnetospectroscopy, Ellipsomentry and Time-Resolved Optical Spectroscopies (MET)
 23-ID-1: Coherent Soft X-ray Scattering (CSX)
 23-ID-2: In situ and Operando Soft X-Ray Spectroscopy (IOS)
29-ID-1: Soft X-ray Nanoprobe (SXN) (under construction)
29-ID-2: NanoARPES and NanoRIXS (ARI) (under construction)

Complex scattering 
 4-ID: Integrated In-situ and Resonant Hard X-ray Studies (ISR)
10-ID: Inelastic X-ray Scattering (IXS)
 11-ID: Coherent Hard X-ray Scattering (CHX)
 11-BM: Complex Materials Scattering (CMS)
 12-ID: Soft Matter Interfaces (SMI)

Storage ring parameters 
NSLS-II is a medium energy (3.0 GeV) electron storage ring designed to deliver photons with high average spectral brightness exceeding 1021 ph/s in the 2 – 10 keV energy range and a flux density exceeding 1015 ph/s in all spectral ranges. This performance requires the storage ring to support a very high-current electron beam (up to 500 mA) with a very small horizontal (down to 0.5 nm-rad) and vertical (8 pm-rad) emittance. The electron beam is stable in its position (<10% of its size), angle (<10% of its divergence), dimensions (<10%), and intensity (±0.5% variation).

Storage ring lattice 
The NSLS-II storage ring lattice consists of 30 double-bend achromat (DBA) cells that can accommodate at least 58 beamlines for user experiments, distributed by type of source as follows:
 15 low-beta ID straights for undulators or superconducting wigglers
 12 high-beta ID straights for either undulators or damping wigglers
 31 BM ports providing broadband sources covering the IR, VUV, and soft x-ray ranges. Any of these ports can alternatively be replaced by a 3PW port covering the hard x-ray range.
 4 BM ports on large gap (90 mm) dipoles for very far-IR

Radiation sources 
Continuing the tradition established by the NSLS, NSLS-II radiation sources span a very wide spectral range, from the far infrared (down to 0.1 eV) to the very hard x-ray region (>300 keV). This is achieved by a combination of bending magnets, three-pole wigglers, and insertion device (ID) sources.

History
Construction of NSLS-II began in 2009 and was completed on-time and under budget in 2014. NSLS-II saw first light in October 2014. The facility cost US$912,000,000 to build, and the project received the DOE's Secretary's Award of Excellence. Torcon Inc., headquartered in New Jersey, was the general contractor selected by the DOE for the project.

References

External links

BNL: National Synchrotron Light Source II (NSLS-II)
BNL Photon Sciences: About NSLS-II
Brookhaven National Laboratory – a passion for discovery
Lightsources.org

Synchrotron radiation facilities
Brookhaven National Laboratory
2015 establishments in New York (state)